Tiger attacks are an extreme form of human–wildlife conflict which occur for various reasons and have claimed more human lives than attacks by any of the other big cats. The most comprehensive study of deaths due to tiger attacks estimates that at least 373,000 people died due to tiger attacks between 1800 and 2009 averaging about 1800 kills per year, the majority of these attacks occurring in India, Nepal and Southeast Asia.

Reasons for attacking

Like most other predators, tigers tend to attack humans only while hunting or when they feel threatened. If a human comes too close and surprises a sleeping or feeding tiger, or a tigress with her cubs, the tiger is prone to respond with aggression. Tigers have also been known to attack humans in cases of "mistaken identity" (for example, if a human is crouching while collecting firewood, or cutting grass) and sometimes when a tourist gets too close. Some also recommend not riding a bicycle, or running in a region where tigers live, so as not to provoke their instinct to chase. Peter Byrne wrote about an Indian postman who was working on foot for many years without any problems with resident tigers, but was chased by a tiger soon after he started riding a bicycle for his work. While in modern times there are on average fewer than 85 people killed and injured by tigers worldwide each year, India has seen sharp increases in absolute numbers of tiger attacks in recent years, as was the case in 2014 and 2015, as a result of human population growth and the expansion of human settlements into the tiger's natural habitat. Many human fatalities and injuries are due to incidents at zoos, or to the man-eating tigers in certain parts of South Asia.

In some cases, tigers will change their natural diet to become man-eaters. This is usually due to a tiger being incapacitated by a gunshot wound or porcupine quills, or some other factors, such as health issues and disabilities. In such cases, the animal's inability to hunt traditional prey forces it to stalk humans, which are less appetizing but generally much easier to chase, overpower, and kill; this was the case with the man-eating tigress of Champawat, which was believed to have begun eating villagers at least partially in response to crippling tooth injuries. As tigers in Asia often live in close proximity to humans, tigers have killed more people than any other big cat species. Between 1876 and 1912, tigers killed 33,247 people in British India.

Man-eating tigers have been a recurrent problem in India, especially in Kumaon, Garhwal and the Sundarbans mangrove swamps of Bengal. There, even otherwise healthy tigers have been known to hunt humans. However, there have also been mentions of man-eaters in old Indian literature, so it appears that after the British occupied India, built roads into forests and brought the tradition of shikar, man-eaters became a nightmare come alive. Even though tigers usually avoid elephants, they have been known to jump on an elephant's back and severely injure the mahout riding on the elephant's back. Kesri Singh mentioned a case when a fatally wounded tiger attacked and killed the hunter who wounded it while the hunter was on the back of an elephant. Most man-eating tigers are eventually captured, shot or poisoned.

During war, tigers may acquire a taste for human flesh from the consumption of corpses which have lain unburied, and go on to attack soldiers; this happened during the Vietnam and Second World Wars. Tigers will stalk groups of people bending down while working in a field or cutting grass, but will lose interest as soon as the people stand upright.  Consequently, it has been hypothesized that some attacks are a simple case of mistaken identity.

Tigers typically surprise victims from the side or from behind: either approaching upwind or lying in wait downwind. Tigers rarely press an attack if they are seen before their ambush is mounted.

Kenneth Anderson once commented on man-eating tigers,

Tigers are sometimes intimidated from attacking humans, especially if they are unfamiliar with people. Tigers, even established man-eating tigers will seldom enter human settlements, usually sticking to village outskirts. Nevertheless, attacks in human villages do occur.

Most tigers will only attack a human if they cannot physically satisfy their needs otherwise. Tigers are typically wary of humans and usually show no preference for human meat. Although humans are relatively easy prey, they are not a desired source of food. Thus, most man-eating tigers are old, infirm, or have missing teeth, and choose human victims out of desperation. In one case, a post-mortem examination of a killed tigress revealed two broken canine teeth, four missing incisors and a loose upper molar, handicaps which would make capturing stronger prey extremely difficult. Only upon reaching this stage did she attack a workman.

In some cases, rather than being predatory, tiger attacks on humans seem to be territorial in nature. In at least one case, a tigress with cubs killed eight people entering her territory without consuming them at all.

Tiger attacks in the Sundarbans

The Bengal tigers of the Sundarbans, bordering India and Bangladesh, used to regularly kill fifty or sixty people a year. This was strange given that the tigers were usually in prime condition and had adequate prey available. Approximately 100 tigers live in this region, possibly the largest single population anywhere in the world. The kill rate has dropped significantly due to better management techniques and now only about three people lose their lives each year . Despite the notoriety associated with this area, humans are only a supplement to the tigers' diet; they do not provide a primary food source.

Tigers and locations known for attacks

The Champawat Tiger
The Champawat Tiger was a man-eating tigress which purportedly killed some 200 men and women before being driven out of Nepal. She moved to Champawat district in the state of Uttarakhand in North India, and continued to kill, bringing her total human kills up to 436. She was finally tracked down and killed in 1907. She was known to enter villages, even during daylight, roaring and causing people to flee in panic to their huts.

The Champawat Tiger was found and killed by Jim Corbett after he followed the trail of blood the tigress left behind after killing her last victim, a 16-year-old girl. Later examination of the tigress showed the upper and lower canine teeth on the right side of her mouth were broken, the upper one in half, the lower one right down to the bone. This permanent injury, Corbett claimed, "had prevented her from killing her natural prey, and had been the cause of her becoming a man-eater."

The Tiger of Segur

The Tiger of Segur was a young man-eating male Bengal tiger who killed five people in the Nilgiri Hills of Tamil Nadu state in South India. Though originating in the District of Malabar District and Wayanad District below the south-western face of the Blue Mountains, the tiger later shifted its hunting grounds to Gudalur and between the Sigur Plateau and Anaikatty in Coimbatore district. It was killed by Kenneth Anderson on the banks of the Segur River, . Anderson later wrote that the tiger had a disability preventing it from hunting its natural prey.

Tigers of Chowgarh
The Tigers of Chowgarh were a pair of man-eating Bengal tigers, consisting of an old tigress and her sub-adult cub, which for over a five-year period killed a reported 64 people in eastern Kumaon Division of Uttarakhand in Northern India over an area spanning . The figures however are uncertain, as the natives of the areas the tigers frequented claimed double that number, and they do not take into account victims who survived direct attacks but died subsequently. Both tigers were killed by Jim Corbett.

Thak man-eater
The Thak man-eater was a tigress from Eastern Kumaon division, who killed only four human victims, but was the last hunt of the hunter, conservationist and author Jim Corbett. Corbett called her up and killed her during late twilight, after he lost all other means to track her down. Postmortem revealed that this tigress had two old gunshot wounds, one of which had become septic. This, according to Corbett, forced her to turn from a normal predator hunting natural prey to a man-eater.

Tiger of Mundachipallam
The Tiger of Mundachipallam was a male Bengal tiger, which in the 1950s killed seven people in the vicinity of the village of Pennagram, four miles (6 km) from the Hogenakkal Falls in Dharmapuri district of Tamil Nadu. Unlike the Segur man-eater, the Mundachipallam tiger had no known infirmities preventing it from hunting its natural prey. Its first three victims were killed in unprovoked attacks, while the subsequent victims were devoured. The Mundachipallam tiger was later killed by Kenneth Anderson.

Man-eater of Bhimashankar

A story was discovered by Pune-based author Sureshchandra Warghade when he ran into an old villager in the Bhimashankar forest which lies near Pune. The villager explained to the author how a man-eating tiger terrorized the entire Bhimashakar area during a span of two years in the 1940s. He was a police constable in that area and he had been responsible for dealing with the formalities surrounding the deaths (missing person reports and death certificates) and other jobs such as helping the hunting parties. During this time the tiger supposedly killed more than 100 people, but it was apparently very careful to avoid discovery; only 2 bodies were ever found. Several hunting parties were organized, but the only one to succeed was an Ambegaon-based hunter named Ismail. During his first attempt, Ismail had a direct confrontation with the tiger and was almost killed. He later called Kenneth Anderson. They returned and killed the tiger. The tiger predominately killed the villagers who slept outside the huts.

The authenticity of the story told by the villager was confirmed when Warghade examined official reports, including a certificate given by the British authorities for killing the man-eating tiger.

Tara of the Dudhwa National Park
While the Sundarbans are particularly well known for tiger attacks, Dudhwa National Park also had several man-eaters in the late 1970s. The first death was on 2 March 1978, closely followed by 3 further kills.

The population demanded action from authorities. The locals wanted the man-eater shot or poisoned. The killings continued, each one making headlines.  Officials soon started to believe that the likely culprit was a tigress called Tara. Conservationist Billy Arjan Singh had taken the British-born cat from Twycross Zoo and raised her in India, with the goal of releasing her back into the wild. His experiments had also been carried out on leopards with some success.

Experts felt that Tara would not have the required skills and correct hunting techniques to survive in the wild and controversy surrounded the project. She also associated men with providing food and comfort, which increased the likelihood that she would approach villages.

Officials later became convinced that Tara had taken to easier prey and become a man-eater. A total of 24 people were killed before the tigress was shot. Singh also joined the hunt with the intent of identifying the man-eater, but firm confirmation of the identity of the tiger was never found.

The debate over the tiger's identity has continued in the years since the attacks. Singh's supporters continue to claim that the tiger was not Tara, and the conservationist has produced evidence to that effect. However, officials maintain that the tiger was definitely Tara.

Other man-eaters from Dudhwa National Park have existed, but this tiger was potentially the first captive-bred tiger to be trained and released into the wild. This controversy cast doubt on the success of Singh's rewilding project.

Problems at Dudhwa have been minor in the past few years. Occasional tiger attacks still occur, but these are no higher than at other wildlife reserves. On average, two villagers are attacked at Ranthambhore Tiger Reserve each year. These attacks generally occur during the monsoon season when the locals enter the reserve to collect grass.

Tigress of Moradabad
In February 2014, reports emerged that a tigress had killed 7 people near the Jim Corbett National Park. The tigress was later called the man-eater of Moradabad, because it was hunting in the Bijnor and Moradabad region. The tigress could not be traced by about 50 camera traps and an unmanned aerial vehicle. In August 2014, it was reported that tigress had stopped killing humans. Its last victim was killed in February, with a total of 7 victims. The animal remained untraced.

Tigress of Yavatmal 
Between 2016 and 2018, a tigress known as T-1 was said to have killed 13 people in Yavatmal district, in the western Indian state of Maharashtra. The tigress was shot dead after a major hunt in November 2018. The tiger was killed in self-defence, after charging those attempting to tranquillise her.

The hunt for the tigress included more than 100 camera traps, bait in the form of horses and goats tied to trees, round-the-clock surveillance from treetop platforms and armed patrols. Drones and a hang glider were also used to try and locate T-1. Wildlife officials also brought in bottles of the perfume Obsession for Men by Calvin Klein, which contains a pheromone called civetone, after an experiment in the US suggested that it could be used to attract jaguars.

Tigers of Bardia National Park, Nepal

In 2021, the four tigers killed ten people and injured several others in Bardia National Park of Nepal. Three of tigers were captured and transferred to rescue centers. One of the tigers escaped from its cage and is yet to be captured.

The tigers were identified and captured from Gaidamachan on 4 April, from Khata on 18 March and from Geruwa on 17 March. The tigers were found with broken canine teeth, possibly due to fighting between two males. After the capture, one of the tiger escaped from the iron cage and went back to the forest in Banke district. Two were housed at the rescue facility in Bardia National Park in Thakurdwara and Rambapur. One was transferred to the Central Zoo in Jawalakhel, Kathmandu.

Measures to prevent tiger attacks

Various measures were taken to prevent and reduce the number of tiger attacks with limited success. For example, since tigers almost always attack from the rear, masks with human faces were worn on the back of the head by the villagers in 1986 in the Sundarbans, on the theory that tigers usually do not attack if seen by their prey. This had temporarily decreased the number of attacks, but only for a short while before the tigers figured out it was not the front of the human being so the villagers no longer wore them for protection. All other means to prevent tiger attacks, such as providing the tigers with more prey by releasing captive bred pigs to the reserve's buffer zones, or placing electrified human dummies to teach tigers to associate attacking people with electric shock, did not work as well and tiger attacks continue. Many measures were thus discontinued due to lack of success.

In captivity

Tiger attacks have also happened in zoos and as exotic pets. Attacks by captive tigers are not that rare. Between 1998 and 2001 there were seven fatal tiger attacks in the United States and at least 20 more attacks that required emergency medical care.
In 1985, a pair of Siberian tigers at the Bronx Zoo attacked and killed one of their keepers in an enclosure that was part of the Wild Asia exhibit.
 In 2003, trainer and performer Roy Horn was attacked by a Siberian white tiger during a live stage performance, disabling Horn and prompting the permanent closure of the show.
In the first incident at the San Francisco Zoo, in 2006, a zookeeper was bitten on the arm during a public feeding. In the second incident in 2007, one person was killed and two others were injured before police officers intervened, shooting and killing Tatiana.
In 2007, a 32-year-old Canadian woman was killed when she was outside the cage petting a tiger, it apparently grabbed her leg and mauled her; causing her to bleed to death.
In 2005, a 17-year-old girl was killed by a captive Siberian tiger at the Lost Creek Animal Sanctuary in Kansas, while taking her high school graduation photo with the animal.
In 2009, at the Calgary Zoo, Vitali, a male Siberian tiger, injured a man trespassing in his enclosure. A handler was also killed by a white tiger in Zion Lion Park.
On 31 July 2012, Kushalappa Gowda (36), a zookeeper at Pilikula Nisargadhama in Mangalore, was killed by an ailing Tiger named Raja after he entered the squeezer cage in spite of warnings. Tiger died of heart attack in May 2015.
in July 2014, an 11-year-old boy was attacked by a tiger in a zoo from Paraná, Brazil. His arm was amputated as a result from his injuries.
In 2014, at the Delhi zoo in India, a male white tiger attacked a 20-year-old mentally unstable man after he accidentally fell into its enclosure. The tiger grabbed the man by the neck and dragged him inside.
In 2015, a handler was killed at Hamilton Zoo in Hamilton, New Zealand.
In 2016, a 38-year-old woman was killed by Hati, a 13-year-old male tiger in an enclosure at the Palm Beach Zoo.
In May 2017, zoo-keeper Rosa King was killed by a Malayan tiger named Cicip at Hamerton Zoo Park in Cambridgeshire, UK. A metal gate meant to separate the workers from the tiger was open when Rosa went to clean the enclosure, leaving her in the same space as the animal, where she was subsequently attacked. 
In 2018, Michael B. Coleman, former mayor of Columbus, Ohio, was attacked by a 6-year-old female tiger in the Columbus Zoo and Aquarium while attending a Leadership Columbus event. He survived the attack with minor injuries.
In 2019, Patty Perry, a conservationist, was attacked at her animal sanctuary in Moorpark, California by two Tigers during a donor event.
 In 2020, a 55-year-old female zookeeper was killed by Irina, a Siberian tiger, in an enclosure at Zurich Zoo.
 On 3 December 2020 a volunteer was bitten and seriously injured by a tiger named Kimba at Big Cat Rescue, the Florida animal sanctuary run by Carole Baskin.
In June 2021 a Siberian male tiger killed a predator park employee and another tiger in Gqeberha, South Africa.
In August 2021 a Bengal tiger killed Catalina Fernanda Torres Ibarra, a 21-year-old female zookeeper, at a safari park in Rancagua, Chile.
 On 29 December 2021, an 8 year old Malayan tiger named Eko at Naples Zoo in South Florida was killed after a cleaning crew member breached barriers after hours and entered an unauthorized area of the tiger enclosure, resulting in the tiger biting his arm. After unsuccessful attempts to get the tiger to release the man, 26 year old River Rosenquist, a Collier County deputy shot the tiger.

See also
 2015 Tbilisi flood#Animals in streets
 Ming of Harlem
 List of large carnivores known to prey on humans

References

External links
 Video 6:12 'Tigers Kill Men!' A short film on rising Man and Tiger conflict and its consequences. The video depicts an encounter of human civilization with the wildlife around the conserved forests at Kaziranga.
Man-eaters – Comprehensive site covering man-eating tigers.
 Tiger attacks other Tiger

Tigers
Felidae attacks